NTVG may refer to:
 No Te Va Gustar, Uruguayan rock band
 Nederlands Tijdschrift voor Geneeskunde, Dutch medical journal